Brian Noble may refer to:

Brian Noble (bishop) (1936–2019), British Roman Catholic bishop
Brian Noble (American football) (born 1962), American football player
Brian Noble (rugby league) (born 1961), English rugby league player and coach